Quasintoceras is a genus of goniatitid ammonites from the Lower Carboniferous Visean included in the Intoceratidae of the Pericyclaceae, now Pericycloidea.

Aquilonites, Intoceras, and Oxintoceras are among related genera.

References 

Goniatitida genera
Pericyclaceae
Mississippian ammonites